The Mufti House is a house located on Rainbow Street-Mango Street intersection in the Jabal Amman neighbourhood of Amman, Jordan. Like many other houses in Jabal Amman, such as the Mango House across the street, 70 years has given the Mufti House time for a significantly wooded front yard to develop. A stair-stepped stone wall covered in ivy separates it from the main street.

History
The Mufti House was built in the late 1920s in the style of the Akrawi and Habböo House located to the south. Built by Umar Hikmat, a prominent Circassian, the house was sold to a fellow Circassian politician, Sa'id al-Mufti, in the mid-1930s. Mufti, who would later become the mayor of Amman, made numerous additions to the house as his prestige as a politician grew. A new kitchen, toilets and a dining room were added, in what would eventually become the present-day house. Most significantly, Mufti added the notable front porch during the 1950s. Around the same time, another house was built to the east of the original house by Shawkat, Mufti's brother. Mufti eventually moved into the house, where he stayed until his death. Sa'id, Mufti's wife, resides in the house today.

Architecture
Similar in style to the Akrawi and Habböo house, the Mufti House features a wide aqua-green front exposure, very much in the style of that era of Amman architecture. The front porticoed balcony features rose-stone columns similar to the stone used by the Mango House across the street. The Mufti house does not face the street, rather, looks in the direction of Jabal Akhddar on the other side of Amman.

See also
Mango House
Rainbow Street
Mango Street
Sa'id al-Mufti
Jabal Amman

References

Houses completed in the 20th century
Houses in Jordan
Buildings and structures in Amman
Architecture in Jordan
1920s establishments in Transjordan